Staffordshire County Council is the top-tier local authority for the non-metropolitan county of Staffordshire, England.

62 councillors sit on Staffordshire County Council. Staffordshire operates a cabinet-style council. The full council elects a cabinet of 10 councillors, including the council leader, from the majority party. Each cabinet member has their own portfolio about which they make the "day to day" decisions.

Council election results

Results summary

|}

|}

|}

|}

References

Local government in Staffordshire
County councils of England
Local authorities in Staffordshire
1889 establishments in England
Local education authorities in England
Major precepting authorities in England
Leader and cabinet executives